Nassarius lavanonoensis is a species of sea snail, a marine gastropod mollusc in the family Nassariidae, the nassa mud snails or dog whelks.

Description
The length of the shell varies between 11 mm and 15 mm.

Distribution
This species occurs in the Indian Ocean off Madagascar.

References

 Bozzetti L. (2006) Nassarius (Aciculina) lavanonoensis (Gastropoda: Prosobranchia: Nassariidae) nuova specie dal Madagascar Meridionale. Malacologia Mostra Mondiale 53: 10-11

External links
 

Nassariidae
Gastropods described in 2006